Sabin Vasile Drăgoi (6 June 1894 – 31 December 1968) was a Romanian composer, who specialized in folk music. His oeuvre includes orchestral and chamber works, film music and operas.

Major works
Constantin Brâncoveanu
Kir Ianulea
Horia
The Misfortune (Năpasta)

1894 births
1968 deaths
20th-century classical composers
Romanian classical composers
Romanian opera composers
Male classical composers
20th-century male musicians